Sergeya is a genus of moths in the family Gelechiidae. The genus contains the single species Sergeya temulenta.

References

Litini
Monotypic moth genera
Taxa described in 2007